Buston is an urban-type settlement and jamoat (municipality) in northern Tajikistan. It is the administrative capital of Mastchoh District in Sughd Region with population of 15,500 (1 January 2020 est.). 
Farmland, mountain ranges and steep valleys and gorges surround Buston.

References

External links
Satellite map at Maplandia.com

Populated places in Sughd Region
Jamoats of Tajikistan